Ratwinit Bangkaeo School is a co-education school developed under the patronage of His Majesty the King Bhumibol Adulyadej, Ratwinit means the place where boys and girls are instructed to be good by His Majesty the King.

History 
Mr Sukhum and Mrs Junforng Thirawat offered the land of 30 rai to H.M. King Bhumibol Adulyadej, for building Ratwinit Bangkaeo school. H.M. King Bhumibol Adulyadej proposed to expand Ratwinit school. Ratwinit Bangkaeo was opened in 2015, at that time, it had 347 students. Now, Ratwitnit Bangkaeo has more area of about 42 rai 2 ngan 30 square two-meters.

Building 
1. Building 1 Romklao
 Finance Department
 Academic Department
 Department of Social Study, Religion and Culture
 Personnel Department
 Chinese and Japanese Language Learning Classroom
2. Building 2 Bongkodmard
 Administration Department
 Student Council Office
 R.W.B. Music & Dance Room
 Department of Mathematics
 Department of Thai Language
3. Building 3 Ratchawitarn
 Department of Science
 Science Laboratory
4. Building 4 Siriyakarn
 Public Relations Room
 Audiovisual Education Room
 School Bank
 Cooking  Laboratory
 Department of Health and Physical Education
 Department of Occupations and Technology
 Department of Foreign Languages
5. Building 5 Chalermprakiat 2
 Old Canteen
 Solar Energy Room
 Audiovisual Education Room 2 
 Learner Development Activities Room
 Computer Room
 Department of Arts
 Gym
 Gifted Science-Math classroom
6. Building 6 Chalermprakiat 1
 Thai Library
 Department of Music and Thai Dance
 Auditorium 
7. Building 7 48 Punsa Chalermprakiat
 MEP Library
 MEP Staff Room
 MEP Classroom
 Chinese Staff Room
 IP Chinese Classroom
 Auditorium 721
 Computer Room
8. Building 8

9. Sport Complex

10. 80 Punsa Auditorium Chalermprakiat Building
 New Canteen
 Auditorium

11. Garden

12. The water pavilion

13. The house of Relief

14. Hall of Fame

15. School Clinic

16. Jariyatham

17. Football Field

References

Schools in Thailand